Nelliyode Vasudevan Namboodiri or Nelliyod Vasudevan Namboodiri (5 February 1940 – 2 August 2021) was a Kathakali artiste, noted primarily for his vibrant portrayal of the evil chuvanna thaadi ("red beard") roles of the classical Kathakali dance-drama from Kerala in south India. He was also very famous and known for the characters 'Kuchelan' from Kuchelavritham and 'Aashaari' from Bakavadham.

Career
Nelliyode was born in 1940 in Cheranalloor in Ernakulam district. He joined the PSV Natyasangham in Kottakkal in 1957 and received training in Kathakali largely under Padma Shri Vazhenkada Kunchu Nair of the tradition. After a teaching stint in Kerala Kalamandalam, he joined as a Kathakali teacher at the Central High School in Thiruvananthapuram. Nelliyode lived in Poojappura near Thiruvananthapuram.

Awards
Nelliyode has received the Central Sangeet Natak Akademi Award and the Kerala Sangeetha Nataka Akademi Award (1999). He has also received Rigatta's 'Natyaratna' title and gold medal in 1976, Thulaseevana award in 1988, Kalamandalam award, Central Government Fellowship, and Onamthuruth temple's 'Natyavisarad' title and the Kerala State Kathakali Prize for 2013.

Repertoire
In Kathakali, Nelliyode is primarily famous for his playing cruel characters like Kali, Trigartan, Dushasanan, Bakan, and Veerabhadran. He also excelled in pious roles like Kuchelan (Sudama) besides demonic kari roles such as Nakrathundi, Simhika, Soorpanakha, Lanka Lakshmi, and the black-bearded Kaatalan (woodsman). Possessing deep knowledge in Sanskrit and the Hindu Puranas, Nelliyode was also capable of presenting Patakam, a classical temple art requiring skills in oratory, and has played the role of the Fool in a production of King Lear.

Significance
Nelliyode is regarded as the leading player of the destructive ‘tamasic’ characters in Kathakali. He has presented a deeper interpretation of these characters and emphasised their central role in the plays.

Death
 
Nelliyode Vasudevan Namboothiri died on 2 August 2021 at the age of 81. He was suffering from pancreatic cancer for some time.

References

Kathakali exponents
1940 births
2021 deaths
People from Ernakulam district
Dancers from Kerala
Malayali people
Recipients of the Sangeet Natak Akademi Award
Indian male dancers
20th-century Indian dancers
Deaths from pancreatic cancer
Recipients of the Kerala Sangeetha Nataka Akademi Fellowship
Recipients of the Kerala Sangeetha Nataka Akademi Award